Famechon is a commune in the Somme département in northern France.

Geography

Demography

See also
Communes of the Somme department

References

Communes of Somme (department)